"Glitter and Trauma" is a song by Biffy Clyro, which opens their 2004 album, ''Infinity Land.
It was the first physical single from the album, and their eighth single overall. It reached number 21 on the UK Singles Chart and became their second top-ten hit in their native Scotland.

Track listing
Music and lyrics by Simon Neil.
CD (BBQ377CD)
 "Glitter and Trauma (Radio Edit)" – 4:06
 "Bonanzoid Deathgrip" – 4:20
 "Stars and Shites" – 3:23

DVD (BBQ377DVD)
 "Glitter and Trauma" (Video)
 "Go Your Own Way" (Fleetwood Mac Cover) – 2:22
 Untitled Movie (Video)

7" (BBQ377)
 "Glitter and Trauma (Radio Edit)" – 4:06
 "There's No Such Thing As A Jaggy Snake (Peel Session)" – 4:43

Personnel
 Simon Neil – guitar, vocals
 Ben Johnston – drums, vocals
 James Johnston – bass, vocals
 Chris Sheldon – producer

Charts

References

External links
"Glitter and Trauma" Lyrics

Biffy Clyro songs
2004 singles
Songs written by Simon Neil
Song recordings produced by Chris Sheldon
Beggars Banquet Records singles
2004 songs